Spring Road is a small railway station in the Acocks Green area of Birmingham, England.  It is situated on the North Warwickshire Line, between Tyseley and Hall Green stations.  The station, and all trains serving it, are operated by West Midlands Railway.

History
The station was opened in 1908 as a halt named Spring Road Platform to ease traffic from the station at Tyseley, and to serve a cluster of cottages on the nearby land, which were owned until 1925 by the landowner at Fox Hollies Hall, Zaccheus Walker IV. The station consisted of two platforms with shelters, with ramps leading from street level to the station below. Passengers had to purchase their tickets on the train.

The station served as a request stop for the railmotor excursions throughout the years before the First World War, with Acocks Green building up around it. Zaccheus Walker IV, who was a well-respected philanthropist in the area, used the station for school trips (paid for by him personally) to the countryside and Stratford upon Avon.

At the end of the Second World War, a factory consisting of two buildings was built alongside the station, belonging to Lucas. The larger of the two known as BW3 and BW4 were later sold to Magneti Marelli in the early 1990s, before passing into the hands of Denso in 2003. The smaller BW5 stayed in the hands of Lucas as part of Lucas Aerospace. Lucas was bought out by TRW in 1998, BW5 has been in the hands of Goodrich since October 2002 when TRW sold off all its aerospace businesses.

In the 1950s, a permanent ticket-office was placed at the top of the ramp leading to Platform 1 (towards Birmingham). An older shelter at the top of this ramp built after the Second World War was converted into a toolshed, which it is used as today.

Workers at the factory first used the station to travel to and from work, which kept the station open during the era of the Beeching Axe, but traffic became less with the appearance of the private car.

Services
During Monday to Saturday daytimes:

 3 trains per hour northbound to Birmingham Moor Street and Birmingham Snow Hill continuing to Stourbridge Junction, with some trains continuing onward to Kidderminster and Worcester.  

References

External links

Rail Around Birmingham and the West Midlands: Spring Hill railway station
 Warwickshire Railways page

Railway stations in Birmingham, West Midlands
DfT Category E stations
Former Great Western Railway stations
Railway stations in Great Britain opened in 1908
Railway stations served by West Midlands Trains
1908 establishments in England